Acericecis ocellaris, known generally as ocellate gall midge, is a species of gall midges in the family Cecidomyiidae. Other common names include the maple eyespot gall and maple leaf spot gall.

References

Further reading

 
 

Cecidomyiinae
Articles created by Qbugbot
Insects described in 1862
Gall-inducing insects